Craig Briscoe (born 8 December 1992) is an English professional rugby league footballer who last played for Oldham (Heritage № 1365) in Betfred League 1.

Briscoe played his junior rugby for Wigan St. Judes ARLFC before joining Leigh's academy side before the 2010 season, going on to make his first team début that season in a fixture away to Batley. He made four further appearances during 2011 and is looking to establish himself in the Leigh first team during 2012. Craig is also the cousin of Widnes player Shaun Briscoe.

He has previously played in the Co-Operative Championship for the Leigh Centurions.

References

External links
Oldham profile
 Leigh Centurions profile

1992 births
Living people
Barrow Raiders players
English rugby league players
Leigh Leopards players
Oldham R.L.F.C. players
Rugby league players from Wigan
Rugby league second-rows